Gevork Andreevich Vartanian (17 February 1924 – 10 January 2012) was a Soviet intelligence officer.

He was primarily responsible, together with his wife Goar Vartanian, for thwarting Operation Long Jump, concocted by Adolf Hitler, headed by Ernst Kaltenbrunner, and led by Otto Skorzeny, which was an attempt to assassinate Stalin, Churchill, and Roosevelt at the Tehran conference in 1943.

Early life
Vartanian was born to Armenian parents in Nor Nakhichevan, USSR.  His father was a Soviet intelligence agent as well who was sent to Persia in 1930, where he worked for 23 years under a cover of a wealthy merchant. Gevork Vartanian was not even 16 when he went into intelligence.

On 4 February 1940, he made contact with the Tehran residency of Soviet intelligence, including Ivan Agayants. In Tehran, Vartanian formed a pro-Soviet group, who were identified by Iranian police in 1941, which led him to spend three months in prison.

Operation Long Jump
In 1942, Adolf Hitler decided to set the operation in motion. After careful planning and deliberation under the personal supervision of Security Police Chief Ernst Kaltenbrunner, Hitler sent his special commando agent, Otto Skorzeny, along with six other men to rendezvous at Tehran and spearhead the operation. The plan entailed the capture and/or assassination of Josef Stalin, Winston Churchill, and Franklin Roosevelt.

The first tip-off about the planned attempt came from Soviet intelligence agent Nikolai Kuznetsov, under the alias of Wehrmacht Oberleutnant Paul Siebert, from Nazi-occupied Ukraine. Kuznetsov got a drunk SS officer named Ulrich von Ortel to tell him about the attempt. Although the scheduled date of the operation was not known, the fact that it would take place was confirmed.
Vartanian had been assigned to recruit agents since 1940. In 1940–41 Vartanian's team of seven intelligence officers had identified more than 400 Nazi agents, all of whom had been arrested by Soviet troops. In the autumn of 1943, they were assigned the task of ensuring the security for the upcoming Tehran conference. In their efforts to foil the assassination plot devised by the Nazis, Vartanian's group located six Nazi radio operators shortly before the conference opened on 28 November 1943. The German assassins had been dropped by parachute near the town of Qom,  from Tehran. Vartanian later said:

All the members of the first group were arrested and forced to contact their handlers under Soviet supervision. The operation got off track and the main group led by Skorzeny never went to Tehran.

Later years
On 30 June 1946, Vartanian married Goar Levonovna. In 1955, Vartanian graduated from the Institute of Foreign Languages, Yerevan. He then spent three decades doing espionage activities in Japan, China, India, France, Italy, United States and West Germany. He was awarded the Hero of the Soviet Union medal in 1984.

In 2003, relying on declassified documents, Yuri Lvovich Kuznets published a book called Tehran-43 or Operation Long Jump, which detailed Vartanian's role at the Tehran Conference. A Soviet film, Teheran 43, which featured the French actor Alain Delon, was released in 1981.

In 2007 he met with Winston Churchill's granddaughter and was congratulated for his great service to the Allies. Vartanian has been interviewed many times. Al Gurnov of Russia Today interviewed Vartanian on the eve of the Victory Day parade, which was broadcast on 9 May 2008. It was revealed that Vartanian's identity was kept secret until 2000, when he finally received full credit for putting a stop to the assassination plot.

Death
Gevork Vartanian died at 87 at Botkin Hospital in Moscow on 10 January 2012. Russian Prime Minister Vladimir Putin attended the funeral and paid his respects to Vartanian's widow Goar, a fellow intelligence officer, who died on 25 November 2019. 

Condolences were also expressed by the President of Armenia Serzh Sargsyan, Prime Minister of Armenia Tigran Sargsyan, and President of the Nagorno-Karabakh Republic Bako Sahakyan.

Legacy 
 October 24, 2012 and in Moscow at the Troekurovsky cemetery, the opening of the monument to Vartanyan took place. The author of the monument sculptural composition was the People's Artist of Russia, laureate of the state Prize, member of the Council for Culture under the President of Russia A. N. Kovalchuk. The ceremony was attended by veterans of the SVR of Russia, cultural and artistic figures, friends and relatives of the scout.
 October 27, 2012 and in Rostov-on-Don a solemn ceremony of laying a nominal "Star" to Gevorg Vartanyan took place on the Avenue of Stars.
 In 2013, the Ministry of Defense of Armenia established the departmental medal "Gevorg Vardanyan" in memory of the intelligence officer. Materials about the operations of the Vartanyan spouses are presented at the Museum of the History of the Security Agencies of Armenia.
 In the center of Yerevana, on the building of Yerevan State Linguistic University named after Valery Bryusov (Tumanyan Street, 42), on May 17, 2014, a memorial plaque was erected in memory of its 1955 graduate Gevork Vartanyan.
 On May 31, 2022, a monument to the Soviet intelligence officer was unveiled in New Moscow on the territory of School No. 2070 named after Hero of the Soviet Union G.A. Vartanyan.

References

External links

 Washington Post Article
 Russia Beyond The Headlines
 

1924 births
Iranian people of Armenian descent
People from Rostov-on-Don
Russian people of Armenian descent
Armenian people of World War II
Soviet people of World War II
Soviet spies
Heroes of the Soviet Union
2012 deaths
Recipients of the Order of Lenin
Recipients of the Order of the Red Banner
Burials in Troyekurovskoye Cemetery
Armenian spies
KGB operatives in Iran